The Azurite FDPSO is the world's first floating, drilling, production, storage and offloading (FDPSO) vessel.

The Azurite FDPSO was built at the shipyard of Hyundai Heavy Industries in 1988 as a very large crude carrier (VLCC). In 1988–1990 her name was Fina Europe, in 1990–1993 Sanco Europe, and in 1993–1997 MT Europe.  She was converted at the Keppel Shipyard from the VLCC to FDPSO between July 2007 and February 2009.

The Azurite FDPSO has storage capacity  of crude oil.

Prosafe Production is responsible for the vessel operations and Murphy Oil is responsible for drilling.

On 10 August 2009, Azurite FDPSO started production at the Azurite offshore oilfield in waters of the Republic of Congo.

References 

Murphy Oil to Release Azurite FDPSO Early (Congo)

Floating production storage and offloading vessels
Drillships
1988 ships
Ships of Panama
Ships built by Hyundai Heavy Industries Group